Big Bay is an unincorporated community in Marquette County of the U.S. state of Michigan.  It is a census-designated place (CDP) for statistical purposes and does not have any legal status as an incorporated municipality. As of the 2020 census, the CDP had a population of 257.  The community is located within Powell Township near the shore of "Big Bay" on Lake Superior.

Although the Big Bay community is served by the Marquette ZIP code 49855, the Big Bay post office with ZIP code 49808, serves a much larger area to the west and south of the community and CDP, including portions of Powell Township as well as Ishpeming, Champion, Michigamme, and Ely townships.

History
Big Bay was established in 1875 by people involved in the lumber industry.

Geography

Demographics

As of the census of 2000, there were 265 people, 129 households, and 86 families residing in the CDP. The racial makeup of the CDP was 96.23% White, 2.26% Native American, and 1.51% from two or more races.

There were 129 households, out of which 15.5% had children under the age of 18 living with them, 59.7% were married couples living together, 3.9% had a female householder with no husband present, and 32.6% were non-families. 28.7% of all households were made up of individuals, and 13.2% had someone living alone who was 65 years of age or older.  The average household size was 2.05 and the average family size was 2.47.

In the CDP, the population was spread out, with 15.1% under the age of 18, 3.4% from 18 to 24, 20.4% from 25 to 44, 37.7% from 45 to 64, and 23.4% who were 65 years of age or older.  The median age was 51 years. For every 100 females, there were 105.4 males.  For every 100 females age 18 and over, there were 114.3 males.

The median income for a household in the CDP was $34,750, and the median income for a family was $42,708. Males had a median income of $35,417 versus $24,375 for females. The per capita income for the CDP was $18,620.  About 7.9% of families and 11.4% of the population were below the poverty line, including 8.7% of those under the age of eighteen and 4.6% of those 65 or over.

Culture 

Big Bay's "claim to fame" is the filming of Anatomy of a Murder in 1959. Filming took place at the Thunder Bay Inn, the Big Bay Lighthouse Bed and Breakfast, the Lumberjack Tavern (scene of the real 1952 crime on which the film is based), Perkins Park Campground, and various other locales.

Bay Cliff Health Camp is located in Big Bay. It is a year-round, non-profit wellness camp for children and adults with physical disabilities.

Climate
This climatic region is typified by large seasonal temperature differences, with warm to hot (and often humid) summers and cold (sometimes severely cold) winters.  According to the Köppen Climate Classification system, Big Bay has a humid continental climate, abbreviated "Dfb" on climate maps.

References

Notes

Sources

Unincorporated communities in Marquette County, Michigan
Census-designated places in Michigan
Populated places established in 1875
1875 establishments in Michigan
Unincorporated communities in Michigan
Census-designated places in Marquette County, Michigan
Michigan populated places on Lake Superior